The fifth season of the Dutch TV series Wie is de Mol? ("Who is the Mole?") aired in the winter of 2005. After the series took a year off the air, Angela Groothuizen returned to host her final season. The season took place in Australia, returning to the first country the series visited, and the island of Bali in Indonesia. The season premiered on January 14, 2005. The Reunion aired on March 18, 2005 where Marc-Marie Huijbregts was declared the winner of the season, earning a grand total of €23,000.-. Huijbregts, alongside his runner-up , had successfully unmasked Yvon Jaspers as the Mole of 2005.

Format
Followed the same format as its Belgian predecessor, this was the first season which had ten Dutch celebrities travel to Australia and Bali, Indonesia to complete Assignments to earn money for the group pot. However, one of the ten is the titular Mole (de Mol), the one designated to sabotage the assignments and cause the group to earn the least amount of money for the winner's pot as possible. Every few days, players would take a 20-question multiple choice test about the identity of the Mole. Once the test is complete, the candidates await their results in an Execution ceremony. The candidate with the worst score is executed from the game, while in the event of the tie the candidate who completed their test the slowest is executed. The season plays out until there are three remaining candidates, where they must complete a final test (consisting of 40 questions). The candidate with the highest score, or had completed their test the fastest in a tie, is declared the winner and receives the group's pot.

Two twists were implemented throughout the season, where at every Execution Ceremony, Angela would reveal the percent of questions that candidates got correct about the Mole. After from the second test onwards, if the candidates had a smaller percentage of correct answers than the previous test, two candidates would be executed from the game instead of one. The Double Execution would only happen once throughout the season, if the candidates had failed to keep their percent up.

At every opportunity, if the Candidates accepted the Mole's offer to sabotage assignments, they would automatically earn 5 correct answers on their next test, regardless of how they performed in the tests.

Candidates

Candidates Progress
The order in which the candidates learned their results are indicated in the table below.

 The candidate is the winner of Wie is de Mol 2005.
 The candidate was unmasked as The Mole 2005.
 The candidate was the losing finalist of Wie is de Mol 2005.
 The candidate saw a Green Screen to proceeded to the next Episode.
 The candidate won an Exemption to automatically proceed to the next Episode.
 The candidate successfully assisted the Mole during an assignment in this episode for automatic correct answers for the test, and saw a Green Screen to proceed to the next Episode.
 The candidate did not see a Green Screen before the Executed player saw their Red Screen. Thus they proceeded to the next Episode.
 The candidate was executed from the game and sent home.
 The candidate was withdrawn from the game for medical reasons, and returned home.
Notes

Episodes
For more information, see: List of seasons of "Wie is de Mol?"

Notes

Season Summary

Mole Sabotage

Hidden Clues

Reception

Viewing Figures
For more information, see: List of seasons of "Wie is de Mol?"

These Viewer ratings included Delayed Viewing.

References

05
2005 Dutch television seasons
Television shows set in Australia
Television shows filmed in Australia
Television shows set in Indonesia
Television shows filmed in Indonesia